The 2015 IMSA Tudor United SportsCar Championship (TUSC) was the second season of the International Motor Sports Association's Tudor United SportsCar Championship and last to be held under that name. It was also the 45th overall season of the IMSA GT championship tracing its lineage to the 1971 IMSA season. It began January 24 with the 24 Hours of Daytona. and ended on October 3 at Petit Le Mans.

Classes
The class structure remained largely unchanged from 2014.

Prototype (P)
Prototype Challenge (PC)
GT Le Mans (GTLM)
GT Daytona (GTD)

2015 will see the introduction of two awards for the top-finishing Pro-Am drivers in Prototype (P) and GT Le Mans (GTLM). The Jim Trueman Award will be given to the top finishing Pro-Am pairing in Prototype, while the Bob Akin Award will be for the top GTLM pairing.  The top Pro-Am pairings from these classes at the end of the year will be given automatic entries to the 2016 24 Hours of Le Mans, with the Trueman award winner eligible for the LMP2 class, while the Akin Award winner would be for the LM GTE Am class.  To be eligible for these awards, the drivers must at a minimum contest the North American Endurance Cup events.

Schedule

Race schedule

The 2015 schedule was released on August 10, 2014 and features twelve rounds.  One major change to the rules for 2015 was a slight reduction of race time to fit television constraints.  Two and three hour races, which were 15 minutes shorter than their times, will have their race times reduced five more minutes, so that they would be 1:40 and 2:40, respectively, instead of 1:45 and 2:45, as was the case in the previous years.  The races set for 6, 10, 12, and 24 hours will remain at the respective lengths.

Calendar changes

The events at Kansas Speedway and Indianapolis Motor Speedway have been discontinued.
A round at Lime Rock Park was added for PC and GTD.
The round at Canadian Tire Motorsports Park will see PC replace GTD alongside P and GTLM.
The IMSA Continental Tire Sports Car Challenge support series follows the same schedule as above in 2015 except for the street circuits of Long Beach and Detroit Belle Isle for a ten-round season.
On October 31, 2014, the calendar was modified removing PC from the Virginia International Raceway round and adding the class to the round at Detroit Belle Isle alongside P and GTD.
The Monterey round would feature all four classes in a single event.

Entries

Prototype

Prototype Challenge
All entries use an Oreca FLM09 chassis powered by a Chevrolet LS3 6.2 L V8.

GT Le Mans

GT Daytona

Results
Bold indicates overall winner.

Championship standings

Points Systems

Championship points are awarded in each class at the finish of each event. Points are awarded based on finishing positions as shown in the chart below.

Drivers Points

Points are awarded in each class at the finish of each event. Drivers must complete a minimum driving time (outlined to teams prior to each event) in order to score points.  A driver does not score points if the minimum drive time is not met.

In addition, for each car credited with a race start, each driver nominated in that car also receives one additional “starting point.”

Team Points

Team points are calculated in exactly the same way as driver points, using the point distribution chart and “starting points.” Each car entered is considered its own “team” regardless if it is a single entry or part of a two-car team.

Manufacturer Points
There are also a number of manufacturer championships which utilize the same season-long point distribution chart, minus the “starting points” used for the driver and team championships. (The “starting point” is not used in manufacturer championship points.) The manufacturer championships recognized by IMSA are as follows:

Prototype (P): Chassis Constructor; Engine Manufacturer
GT Le Mans (GTLM): Car Manufacturer; Tire Manufacturer
GT Daytona (GTD): Car Manufacturer

Each manufacturer receives finishing points for its highest finishing car in each class. The positions of subsequent finishing cars from the same manufacturer are not taken into consideration, and all other manufacturers move up in the order.

Example: Manufacturer A finishes 1st and 2nd at an event, and Manufacturer B finishes 3rd. Manufacturer A receives 35 first-place points while Manufacturer B would earn 32 second-place points.

The points system from the 2014 season is the same as in 2015.

North American Endurance Cup
The points system for the North American Endurance Cup is different from the normal points system. Points are awarded on a 5-4-3-2 basis for drivers, teams and manufacturers. The first finishing position at each interval earns five points, four points for second position, three points for third, with two points awarded for fourth and each subsequent finishing position.

At Daytona (24 hour race), points are awarded at six hours, 12 hours, 18 hours and at the finish. At the Sebring (12 hour race), points are awarded at four hours, eight hours and at the finish.  At Watkins Glen (6 hour race), points are awarded at three hours and at the finish.  At Road Atlanta (10-hour race), points are awarded at four hours, eight hours and at the finish.

Like the season-long team championship, North American Endurance Cup team points are awarded for each car and drivers get points in any car that they drive, in which they are entered for points.  The manufacturer points go to the highest placed car from that manufacturer (the others from that manufacturer not being counted), just like the season-long manufacturer championship.

For example: in any particular segment manufacturer A finishes 1st and 2nd and manufacturer B finishes 3rd. Manufacturer A only receives first-place points for that segment. Manufacturer B receives the second-place points.

Drivers' Championships

Prototype

Notes
1 – All drivers of car #10 were moved to last in class at Daytona for exceeding maximum drive-time limitation.
2 – The #7 of Starworks Motorsport withdrew from the 12 Hours of Sebring before Practice with only Scott Mayer and Brendon Hartley confirmed as drivers.

Prototype Challenge

Notes
1 – Three drivers of car #8, Mirco Schultis, Renger van der Zande and Mike Hedlund, only scored one point at Daytona for exceeding maximum drive-time limitation.
2 – Two drivers of car #11, Gustavo Menezes and Jack Hawksworth, only scored one point at Daytona for exceeding maximum drive-time limitation.
3 – All drivers of car #16 were moved to last in class and only scored one point at Daytona for exceeding maximum drive-time limitation.
4 – Two drivers of car #85, Chris Miller and Gerry Kraut, only scored one point at Sebring for exceeding maximum drive-time limitation.
 Drivers denoted by † did not complete sufficient laps in order to score points.

GT Le Mans

GT Daytona

Notes
1 – Three drivers of car #73, Jim Norman, Nelson Canache Jr. and Kévin Estre, only scored one point at Daytona for exceeding maximum drive-time limitation.
2 – Michael Avenatti, driving with four other drivers in car #81, only scored one point at Daytona for exceeding maximum drive-time limitation.
3 – Two drivers of car #19, Ricardo Flores Jr. and Jim Michaelian, only scored one point at Daytona for exceeding maximum drive-time limitation.
4 – The #18 of Mühlner Motorsport America and the #009 of TRG-AMR North America withdrew from the 12 Hours of Sebring before Practice with only Connor De Phillippi and Dennis Trebing confirmed as drivers respectively.
 Drivers denoted by † did not complete sufficient laps in order to score points.

Teams' Championships

Prototype

Notes
1 – Car #10 was moved to last in class at Daytona for exceeding maximum drive-time limitation.
2 – The #7 of Starworks Motorsport withdrew from the 12 Hours of Sebring before Practice with only Scott Mayer and Brendon Hartley confirmed as drivers.

Prototype Challenge

Notes
1 – Car #16 was moved to last in class and only scored one point at Daytona for exceeding maximum drive-time limitation.
 Cars denoted by † did not complete sufficient laps in order to score points.

GT Le Mans

GT Daytona

Notes
1 – The #18 of Mühlner Motorsport America and the #009 of TRG-AMR North America withdrew from the 12 Hours of Sebring before Practice with only Connor De Phillippi and Dennis Trebing confirmed as drivers respectively.
 Cars denoted by † did not complete sufficient laps in order to score points.

Manufacturers' Championships

Prototype

GT Le Mans

GT Daytona

Notes
1 – Porsche was unable to score at Laguna Seca due to a technical infraction, so they did not get the 35 points the winner usually gets. Audi finished second in the manufacturers' championship that race, but they did not get the points for first place.

Tires' Championship
No North American Endurance Cup in the tires' championship

GT Le Mans

Notes

References

External links
 

WeatherTech SportsCar Championship seasons
United SportsCar Championship